Auke, pron. [ˈaukə], is a quite common West Frisian masculine given name. It seems to have been a diminutive form originally (-ke is one of the most common diminutive suffices in West Frisian), which developed from the historic form Auwe or Auwen. According to onomatologist Rienk de Haan, Auwe was a very reduced form of certain Germanic names, possibly starting with Alf- (meaning "elf", "supernatural" or "nature spirit").

In West Frisian, masculine given names can usually be adapted to equivalent feminine given names. In the case of Auke, this is accomplished by dropping the voiceless final syllable and adding a diminutive suffix in its place (in this case -je), resulting in Aukje. This is a very common feminine given name in Friesland.


People named Auke
Notable people with the name Auke include:

Auke Adema (1907–1976), a Dutch skater and winner of the Elfstedentocht
Auke Bloembergen (born 1927), a Dutch jurist and legal scholar
Auke Hulst (born 1975), a Dutch writer and musician
Auke Stellingwerf (1635–1665), a Dutch (Frisian) admiral
Auke Tellegen, an American psychologist
Auke Zijlstra (born 1964), a Dutch politician

People named Aukje
Notable people with the name Aukje include:

Aukje de Vries (born 1964), a Dutch (Frisian) politician

See also
Auken
Hauke

References

Frisian masculine given names